Smugglers' Notch Resort is a ski resort area in the town of Cambridge, Vermont, United States, located near the village of Jeffersonville. Its namesake is a narrow notch (mountain pass) running adjacent to Sterling Mountain, which smugglers used many years ago. Smugglers' Notch, nicknamed Smuggs, consists of three mountains: Morse, Madonna, and Sterling. The resort attracts skiers in the winter and summer vacationers during the warmer months.

History
Smugglers' Notch was founded in 1956 by a group of Vermont skiers. The first lifts were two Pomas (or platter lifts) on Sterling Mountain.

In the early 1960s, Tom Watson Jr., Chairman of IBM, became involved with the mountain. The site of the village today was an open field and logging station. Watson envisioned a village patterned after those found in Europe. Soon, he developed the nearby Morse and Madonna mountains. It is said that Watson placed the bottom of the Madonna I chairlift several feet below the lodge to obtain the honor of owning the world's longest bottom-drive chairlift at the time.

After this was done, Watson started on the Village at Morse that he had envisioned. He hired Stanley Snider of Stanmar, a Massachusetts-based developer and Martha's Vineyard resort owner, to create that village. After a heart attack, Watson began to divest in some of his business holdings and sold Smuggs to Snider and Stanmar, who operated the resort for years. At that time Terpstra and Morrow constructed a large in-ground pool and 24 four-bedroom, four-bath, pool-front luxury condominiums.  Terpstra is still a very active property owner at the entrance of the resort. They hired AT&T's Bill Stritzler, who owned a home at Smuggs, as the Managing Director of the resort. When Snider retired, he sold the resort to Stritzler.

Area
Smugglers' Notch namesake comes from the smugglers of the early nineteenth century, who used the thick forest on the mountain range, and the caves and caverns along the Long Trail to transport illegal or embargoed goods across the Canada–US border. The notch was most likely involved in bootlegging during the Prohibition-era of the 1920s, using the same caves as a cache for smuggled Canadian beer, wine, and spirits. Scenic Smugglers' Notch proper comprises Sterling Mountain/Spruce Peak ridgeline to the east and Mount Mansfield to the west. Extremely steep terrain drops down into the notch where Vermont Route 108 winds through switchbacks below, connecting Smuggler's Notch Resort with adjacent Stowe Mountain Resort a few miles to the south.  The road is closed to cars November–April, but open to snowmobilers and winter sports enthusiasts.

Winter

In the winter, the resort centers around skiing and snowboarding. A fleet of Hall double chairlifts service a variety of terrain, including novice trails at Morse Mountain and The Village area, and intermediate and expert terrain on the main mountains, Sterling and Madonna. Smugglers Notch is the only resort in Vermont with a triple black diamond.

Resort
Smugglers' Notch Resort is owned by William Stritzler.

Summer and autumn
Smugglers Notch has numerous heated pools and organized kids camps during the summer as well as a canopy tour that involves both scenic hikes and zip lines.

References

External links
 Official website
 Smuggs snow report
 Ski map

Buildings and structures in Cambridge, Vermont
Ski areas and resorts in Vermont
Timeshare
Tourist attractions in Lamoille County, Vermont
Buildings and structures in Lamoille County, Vermont